The Flag Lieutenant may refer to:

 The Flag Lieutenant (1919 film)
 The Flag Lieutenant (1926 film), a 1926 British war film 
 The Flag Lieutenant (1932 film), a 1932 British war film